Somalis in Finland are residents and citizens of Finland of Somali ancestry.

Overview

The first Somali immigrants came to Finland in the late 1980s and early 1990s. In 1990, 44 Somali students studying in the Soviet Union immigrated to Finland. Between 1990 and 1995, the number of Somalia citizens in Finland increased from 44 to 4,044. The first arrivals were university students from Soviet universities in the former Soviet Union (see Zahra Abdulla). Later, more asylum seekers arrived directly from Somalia, many through a program of family unification.

In 2010, it was estimated by the Finnish immigration service (Migri) that a majority of all Somali refugees arriving in Finland were illiterate due to the Somali Civil War having destroyed the opportunities for those born after the 70s to attend the school system.

A 2012 Terveyden ja hyvinvoinnin laitos (THL) survey of Somalia-born immigrants in Finland found that, prior to their arrival, around 50% of males and 50% of females had attended primary school (Peruskoulu), 39% of males and 17% of females had attended high school (Lukio), and 11% of males and 33% of females had not attended school (Ei lainkaan). According to Statistics Finland, in 2012, 77.9% of Somalia-born immigrants in Finland had attained a lower secondary or unknown education level, 17.9% had attained an upper secondary education level, and 4.2% had attained a tertiary education level.

Like other immigrant groups in Finland, particularly Muslims, Somalis have been targets of hate crimes. According to a 2009 report by the Police College of Finland, 8% of total victims were Somali-born, while representing only 4% of suspected offenders. Most suspected perpetrators are young Finnish men, with similarly-aged Somali, Iraqi and Turkish immigrants mainly targeted. According to social workers, the pressure of living between two disparate cultures has also resulted in instances of petty crime amongst disaffected 17- to 20-year-olds in the Somali community. The situation is compounded by the unfamiliarity of Somali parents with the various social services that are available to address similar circumstances. To tackle the issue, Somali community organizations have teamed up with Finnish police and social services officials, with the municipal authorities in Helsinki endeavouring to recruit more Somali social workers.

In 2015, five young Somalis were suspects in a case of gang rape in Tapanila near Helsinki. The incident hardened the attitudes towards Somalis in Finland. Of the five accused, three were sentenced and two were acquitted. Four of the accused were minors and two of those therefore received shorter sentences.

As with many other immigrant groups in Finland, Somalis have also faced some barriers to employment, due in part to the local economic recession. However, the situation has steadily improved over the years, as more Somali immigrants have found employment in their own community, although much of this work is unmeasured. While some Somalis with language training have found jobs in their own field, others, like immigrants in general, have obtained short-term work positions.

Demographics

Somalis are one of the largest ethnic minorities in Finland, and the largest group of people of non-European origin. They are the fifth-largest minority in the country, after Finland-Swedes, Russians, Iraqis and Estonians. In 2018, there were 6,448 Somali citizens, but an equal number may have received Finnish citizenship. According to the Finnish National newspaper, Helsingin Sanomat, the number of Somali-speaking people in Finland in 2010 rose by nearly 10% in a year. In 2021, there were 23,656 Somali speakers in Finland. 12,712 were born in Somalia.

78% of Somalis live in Uusimaa, 8% in Southwest Finland, 3% in Pirkanmaa and 11% in the rest of Finland. 35% of Somalis are under-aged.

The total fertility rate of Somali women in Finland was 3.7 between 2017 and 2020, compared to 1.4 of Finnish women.

Culture
Religion is more important to Somali families than it is to Finnish families. 84% of Somalis consider themselves very religious, and only 1% are irreligious. Even though nearly all Somalis are Muslim, there are differences between families and individuals on how norms are perceived and obeyed. The clothing of Somali women in Finland varies from big hijabs and face covers to skinny jeans and crop tops. There are a few Christian converts and Somali atheists in Finland.

Somalis watch at least nine different Somali channels in Finland. Popular celebrations among Somalis include Eid al-Fitr and Eid al-Adha.

Identity and society
Among the studied foreign-language speakers, Somali-speakers had the highest proportion identifying as Finnish, at 43%. For comparison, only 10% of Estonian-speakers identified as Finnish. 89% considered themselves to be completely Somali, and nearly half of the Somali-speakers felt that they were both Somali and Finnish. However 90% of Somali-speakers faced discrimination in the working life. This is significantly higher than among Arabic-speakers (57%), Russian-speakers (51%), English-speakers (40%) and Estonian-speakers (around a quarter). Somali-speakers had the highest proficiency of Finnish among foreign-speakers (with 29% speaking Finnish natively, and only 15% had no Finnish-skills), however were the least likely to have a Finnish-speaking friend. 45% of them had no Finnish-speaking friends. Somalis were also the most likely to think that the Finnish media gives a negative perception of their group.

Politics

In the 2017 Finnish municipal elections Somalis were the most active voters among foreign-citizens. 39% of Somalis voted in the election, more than Swedes (36%), Russians (16%) and Estonians (10%). Suldaan Said Ahmed (Left Alliance) became Finland's first Somali-born Member of Parliament in 2021. Zahra Abdulla (Green League) was a member of the Helsinki City Council from 1997 to 2017. In 2003 she was named the Finnish Refugee Woman of the Year.

Notable people

See also
 Zahra Abdulla
 Somali diaspora

References

External links
  Ulkomaalaiset Suomessa

Ethnic groups in Finland
 
Islam in Finland
Muslim communities in Europe
Finland